Tagab may refer to:

Tagab District, Badakhshan, in Badakhshan Province, Afghanistan
Tagab District, Kapisa, in Kapisa Province, Afghanistan
 Tagab, Kapisa Province, a village in Tagab District
Tagab, Orūzgān, a place in Orūzgān Province, Afghanistan
 Tagab Robat, a village in Badghis Province, Afghanistan
TÅGAB, a Swedish railway company